Willem Bijkerk (born 20 April 1980), known professionally as Waylon, is a Dutch singer. His stage name came from the name of his idol Waylon Jennings. He represented the Netherlands with Ilse DeLange as part of the Common Linnets at the Eurovision Song Contest 2014, finishing in second place in the final. He represented the Netherlands again as a solo artist in the Eurovision Song Contest 2018 and finished in 18th place.

Career
Waylon started his career in 1995 singing in the television program Telekids where he sang the chorus of the song "Harry Stallion." Since childhood he was inspired by country music and he played the drums with the band West Virginian Railroad. He was signed in 1997 by EMI and went to Nashville to record an album. The album was never completed.

In 2001, he lived and worked for a year in the United States where he also performed with his idol, Waylon Jennings. After Jennings died in 2002, Waylon returned to the Netherlands.  Waylon's talent was further developed with Lisa Boray. After returning from the United States, he joined the cover band Santa Rosa. He also sang in the band Millstreet. In 2005, Waylon and Rachel Kramer performed as the duo Rachel & Waylon in the preliminary rounds of the National Song Contest with the song "Leven als een beest."

Breakthrough
Waylon took part in the first season of Holland's Got Talent on SBS 6 in 2008. He auditioned with the song "It's a Man's Man's Man's World" by James Brown. He received positive feedback from jurors Henkjan Smits and Patricia Paay. Waylon reached the final and finished second.

A year later, Universal Music signed Waylon as the first Dutchman to the Motown label. His first single, "Wicked Way", was released on 7 August 2009 as a preview of the album Wicked Ways, released later that month. "Wicked Way" reached the top 10 in the Dutch Top 40 charts.

In April 2010, Waylon won his first major music award, a 3FM Award for "Best Newcomer". A month later he received in a gold record for his debut album on the television program De Wereld Draait Door. In June 2010, Waylon was one of the winners of the TMF Awards, winning the Borsato Award for new talent. The prize was awarded to him by the namesake, Marco Borsato, at the TMF Awards Festival in Enschede.

Waylon released "The Escapist" in October 2011 as the first single from his second album, After All, which was released on 3 November 2011. This was followed by the singles "Lose It" and "Lucky Night". Waylon was voted best singer in the April 2012 3FM Awards.

Eurovision Song Contest 2014
Together with singer Ilse Delange, Waylon was the Dutch entry to the Eurovision Song Contest 2014 in Copenhagen. The two formed the duo The Common Linnets and sang the country/bluegrass song "Calm After the Storm". They won second place with a total of 238 points behind Conchita Wurst from Austria, who scored 290 points.

Waylon last performed with Delange at a concert on 21 June 2014 in Enschede, following which he left The Common Linnets.

Heaven After Midnight
Waylon's third studio album, Heaven After Midnight, was released in September 2014 and reached #1 in the Dutch iTunes charts as well as in the Dutch Album Top 100 in the week of its release. He worked in Nashville and Hollywood on the album with, among others, Bruce Gaitsch, who previously wrote for Chicago and Madonna.

Seeds 
In 2016, Waylon made a few appearances on talk show RTL Late Night; he lectured about the origins of pop-music and previewed tracks from his forthcoming album which came as a surprise. Seeds covered all styles and was led by the 70s-disco-tribute Our Song. He continued to explore his versatility by playing an annual concert-series in at the Rotterdam Ahoy in a joint venture with Radio Veronica's Top 1000 All Time Classics.

Eurovision Song Contest 2018
On 9 November 2017, it was announced that Waylon would participate in the Eurovision Song Contest 2018 for the Netherlands. The choice of the song "Outlaw in 'Em" was announced on 2 March 2018. The Eurovision Song Contest fans gave him the pet name 'Walton'.
He performed in the second semi-final on 10 May 2018 and qualified for the final on 12 May 2018. Waylon finished 18th place with 121 points. In June 2018, Waylon returned to RTL Late Night to perform Thanks But No Thanks, one of the other shortlisted songs, for the departing host Humberto Tan.

In 2019 Waylon returned as a professional in It Takes Two. He also hosted the second episode of DWDD Summerschool exploring the key-artists of Outlaw country.  He continued to do so in a theatre-tour titled My Heroes Have Always Been Cowboys.

Human
Late 2019, Waylon released his sixth album Human; early 2020, he announced that the fifth edition of his Ahoy concert-series will be devoted to Dutch(-language) pop classics.

Personal life
He married in 2002, fathered a son, Dylan, and divorced after three years of marriage. He has a daughter with YouTuber Bibi Breijman.

Discography

Studio albums

Singles

References

External links 

1980 births
Living people
Dutch pop singers
People from Apeldoorn
Dutch country singers
Eurovision Song Contest entrants for the Netherlands
Eurovision Song Contest entrants of 2014
Eurovision Song Contest entrants of 2018
English-language singers from the Netherlands
21st-century Dutch male singers
21st-century Dutch singers
Nationaal Songfestival contestants